The Tema Motorway Interchange is a variant of Diverging diamond interchange which replaced Tema Roundabout, situated east of the Tema Motorway. It carries four-lane trunk roads that connects Tema Motorway, Aflao Road, Akosombo Road and Tema Harbour Road.

Financing
The interchange cost 60 million dollars and was funded by the Japan International Cooperation Agency.

References

Roads in Ghana
Road interchanges in Ghana